Idalus irrupta is a moth of the subfamily Arctiinae. It was described by Schaus in 1905. It is found in Guyana.

References

irrupta
Moths described in 1905